Terror Television American Series 1970–1999 is an American reference book by John Kenneth Muir that documents television horror shows from 1970 to 1999.

Format
The book is categorized into three parts. Part 1, "The Horror Series", chronicles three types of programs. First the anthology series features shows including Night Gallery, Tales from the Darkside, Tales from the Crypt, Second the adventure format includes shows like The X-Files, Kolchak: the Night Stalker and Buffy the Vampire Slayer. Third the soap opera format including Twin Peaks, Kindred: the Embraced and American Gothic. Part 2, "If It Sounds Like Horror..." features series including Amazing Stories, The Munsters Today, Nowhere Man and Sabrina, the Teenage Witch. Part 3, "Further Thoughts" compiles lists including the 10 Best and 10 worst terror television shows.

Reception
Booklist gave a positive review citing it as "useful" and praising the author's dedication.

References

2002 non-fiction books
Books about television